Rodeo is a 1952 American sports drama film directed by William Beaudine and starring Jane Nigh, John Archer and Wallace Ford. The film was made in cinecolor.

Plot

When the rodeo association owes her father a feed bill of $1,800, Nancy Cartwright goes to collect. To her shock, she discovers that not only has the association no funds, rodeo rider Slim Martin and others want Nancy to run the association.

She agrees to take over, and a romantic attachment develops between Nancy and Slim. A misunderstanding results in a past-his-prime performer, Barbecue Jones, attempting a comeback and being seriously injured. But things work out well in the end, Nancy restoring the association's finances and paying Barbecue's medical bills.

Cast
 Jane Nigh as Nancy Cartwright  
 John Archer as Slim Martin  
 Wallace Ford as Barbecue Jones  
 Gary Gray as Joey Cartwright  
 Frances Rafferty as Dixie Benson  
 Sara Haden as Agatha Cartwright 
 Frank Ferguson as Harry Cartwright 
 Myron Healey as Richard Durston  
 Fuzzy Knight as Jazbo Davis  
 Robert Karnes as Charles Olenick  
 Jim Bannon as Bat Gorman  
 I. Stanford Jolley as Pete Adkins  
 Ann Doran as Mrs. Martha Durston 
 Russell Hicks as Allen H. Grandstead

References

Bibliography
 Marshall, Wendy L. William Beaudine: From Silents to Television. Scarecrow Press, 2005.

External links

1952 films
American sports drama films
Cinecolor films
1950s sports drama films
1950s English-language films
Films directed by William Beaudine
Films produced by Walter Mirisch
Monogram Pictures films
1952 drama films
1950s American films